Massachusetts House of Representatives' 2nd Essex district in the United States is one of 160 legislative districts included in the lower house of the Massachusetts General Court. It covers part of Essex County. Republican Lenny Mirra of Georgetown represented the district from 2013–2023. Kristin Kassner of Hamilton has represented the district since February 2023.

Following redistricting efforts in 2021, the 2nd Essex shifted south, engulfing several communities in the old 4th Essex District. The district now includes the towns of Georgetown, Hamilton, Ipswich, Newbury, Rowley, and part of Topsfield.

Locales represented
The district includes the following localities:
 part of Topsfield
 Georgetown
 Ipswich
 Hamilton
 Rowley
 Newbury

The current district geographic boundary overlaps with those of the Massachusetts Senate's 1st Essex and Middlesex districts.

From 2013-2023, the Second Essex district  included the following localities:
 Groveland
 Georgetown
 Merrimac
 Newbury
 West Newbury
 Parts of Haverhill
 Parts of Boxford

Representatives

 Marcus Morton Jr., circa 1858 
 William Chickering, circa 1859 
 Alden Potter Jaques, circa 1888 
 J. Otis Wardwell, circa 1888 
 Brad Dudley Harvey, circa 1920

Multi-member district

Single member district, 1965–present

See also
 List of Massachusetts House of Representatives elections
 Other Essex County districts of the Massachusetts House of Representatives: 1st, 3rd, 4th, 5th, 6th, 7th, 8th, 9th, 10th, 11th, 12th, 13th, 14th, 15th, 16th, 17th, 18th
 Essex County districts of the Massachusett Senate: 1st, 2nd, 3rd; 1st Essex and Middlesex; 2nd Essex and Middlesex
 List of Massachusetts General Courts
 List of former districts of the Massachusetts House of Representatives

Images

References

External links
 Ballotpedia
  (State House district information based on U.S. Census Bureau's American Community Survey).

House
Government of Essex County, Massachusetts